The Canon PowerShot G is a series of digital cameras introduced by Canon in its PowerShot line in 2000. The G series cameras are Canon's flagship compact models aimed at photography enthusiasts desiring more flexibility than a point-and-shoot without the bulk of a digital single-lens reflex camera.

The G series has a lithium-ion battery, full manual exposure control, an articulated LCD screen (G7, G9, G10, G15, and G16 have a fixed screen), Raw image format capture (all models except G7), a lens with a wider maximum aperture than standard PowerShot models, remote capture (except G11), and faster image processing. The range also includes a hot shoe (except G7 X and G9 X) for an external flashgun, including Canon's EX range. New models in the series have larger sensors than most other point-and-shoot cameras (G1X, G1X Mark II, G7X).

Main specifications

G1 to G6
Common features across the early G series were:
 A fast lens (minimum F number of 2.0).
 A flip out and twist LCD, along with a smaller status LCD on the top of the camera.
 Raw image format capture.
 1/1.8″ CCD sensor.
 Manual selection of aperture and shutter priority.
 Custom white balance.
 Built in flash.
 Hot-shoe for external flash.
 USB connectivity.
 A Compact Flash card slot.
 Availability of optional wide and teleconverter lenses.
 Canon's proprietary EOS shooting modes, allowing the photographer to select different exposure settings for different environments.
 Included infrared remote control.
 In-built neutral density filter from the G3 onwards.
 Lithium ion battery.

G7 to G12

The G7 marked a major change in the G series. Previous G series models had a fast lens, raw image format capture, and a tilt-and-swivel LCD. These were all considered hallmarks of the G series, but were removed or altered for the G7. Some of the major changes included:
 Introduction of a lens with a minimum F number of 2.8, compared to 2.0 in other G series cameras. Although slower, this lens introduced improvements such as optical image stabilisation, a higher zoom range (6×), and a macro mode that would focus as close as 1 cm. The lens would also retract completely into the camera.
 Change to a fixed LCD rather than a tilt-and-swivel model. The fixed LCD was larger (2.5″ versus 2.0″ on the G6) and increased the number of pixels by 75%. The tilt-and swivel LCD was restored with the G11, but removed again with the G15.
 Removal of RAW image format on G7, but returned for the G9–G15.
 No infrared remote control.
 Change from CompactFlash to SDHC card storage.
 Black, mostly metal, body.
 Canon G12 records videos up to 720p HD quality, G15 1080p HD and G1 X 1080p. G15 and G1 X do allow to use zoom and autofocus during video recording.

Many of the changes made allowed the G7 to be significantly slimmer than previous G series cameras (e.g., the thickness of the G7 is 4.25 cm while the G6 is 7.3 cm), making it more portable.

Canon's removal of RAW shooting support was heavily criticized. DPReview expressed their disappointment with the loss of RAW format, while Luminous Landscape stated that the removal of RAW required too many technical decisions had to be made while shooting instead of during post-processing. RAW support can be enabled on the G7 using a free firmware add-on.

The G9 was released in 2007. RAW support was restored, and it has a larger LCD screen, and a 1/1.7″ sensor rather than the 1/1.8″ sensor on previous models.

The G11, released in 2009, reintroduced the flip out and twist LCD (2.8″). It also has a lower resolution sensor than that of its predecessor, the G10, because the new CCD favoured low light performance over resolution.

G15 and G16

The G15 was the successor to the G12 as the cheaper G-series model. It marked a return to a lens faster than those of early G cameras. It also has:
 Minimum F numbers of 1.8 at the wide end and 2.8 at the tele end of the zoom range; the G12 had a minimum F number of 2.8 at the wide end
 Pop-up flash button from the top of the camera

Because of the much larger sensor the G1 X still remained the top model despite G15 having nominally larger aperture.

The G16 shows only minor improvements over the G15, for example:
 faster image processing
 automatic star/star trail photography
 60 fps HD movies
 Wi-Fi

G1 X

The G1 X was introduced in February 2012 and is a significant step out of the traditional G-line because of its much larger sensor, and it is the first model with a CMOS sensor. The G1 X's sensor measures 18.7 x 14.0 mm (1.5"), which makes it even 16 percent bigger than the Micro Four Thirds standard (MFT), and 20 percent smaller than APS-C Canon sensor. G1 X was significant that it did not replace the older G12 but created a parallel model in the first time in G-series. Later that trend would continue with five parallel models from 2015 on. The camera is also bigger and heavier than the other G-series cameras, and the zoom range in equivalent 35mm is only 28-112mm (4x). With its maximum aperture over its zoom range being F2.8-5.8, and with its sensor smaller than Canon APS-C sensor, the G1 X camera-lens system can be compared to the APS-C DSLRs using the Canon EF-S 18-55mm f/3.5-5.6 IS II SLR Kit Lens:  the G1 X is a little faster (wider aperture) at the wide angle and comparable thereafter, but with a longer zoom.

Released at early 2014, the G1 X Mark II has a 13.1-megapixel (in 4:3 aspect ratio), but still 1.5" CMOS sensor as the predecessor, a 24-120mm (5x) f/2-3.9 relatively a fast zoom lens, for better shallow depth of field throughout the maximum-aperture range, and sharp shots even in low light, a DIGIC 6 processor with capability to take 1080/60p MP4 video shoots. The camera lacks internal viewfinder but supports an external electronic one. It has no microphone input or headphone jack.

In October 2017 Canon introduced the third model of the G1 X-series: Canon PowerShot G1 X mark III. It replaced the 1.5" sensor with a 24 megapixel APS-C sensor used in many Canon EOS DSLR and mirrorless cameras. The camera also was much reduced in size and weight, weighting only 399 grams. To achieve the reduced size the zoom range was reduced to 15–45 mm (24–72 mm in 35 mm equivalence) and the size of the aperture was reduced from f/2.0-3.9 to f/2.8-5.6. The Mark III also has internal viewfinder and a DSLR-like form factor much similar to the G5 X. It also is the first PowerShot (with the exception of waterproof D-series) to have weather sealing.

G3 X
G3 X is the superzoom model in the G-series. It offers a 25x zoom (24–600 mm equivalent) with aperture f/2.8-5.6. It offers an alternative to the Canon Powershot SX-series cameras with much better image quality. Because of the lens the camera is much larger than other G-series cameras - weighing 739 grams. The camera supports an optional electronic viewfinder

G5 X and G9 X
In Q3 2015 Canon introduced the successors to its older G16 and S120 cameras. These were G5 X and G9 X respectively. Both of these use one inch sensor instead of the older 1/1.7". The G5 X is essentially a G7 X with an integral electronic viewfinder. The G16 had an optical viewfinder. The G5 X also has a DSLR-like form factor with viewfinder in the center instead of the rangefinder-like in the G16. The G9 X is similar in size to the S120 it replaced. The larger sensor necessitated that the zoom range was reduced from 5x to 3x i.e. 24 – 120 mm to 28 – 84 mm. With the introduction of the G9 X the S-series was discontinued and all top models are in G-series. It also meant the end of the use of 1/1.7" (9.5 mm diagonal) sensors in Canon cameras and all top models being at least one inch (16 mm diagonal) and other models having 1/2.3" (7.7 mm diagonal).

In 2017 Canon updated the G9 X into G9 X mark II with the new Digic 7 processor, faster operation and built in RAW processing. No external changes were done.

G7 X 

With the G7 X, Canon added its own model to the large-sensor compact camera market. The G7X is Canon's first 1-inch sensor model, and boasts 20.2-megapixels and the DIGIC 6 image processor. Despite this, the camera is still small enough to be pocketable, like its primary competitor, the Sony RX100. It has a 4.2x zoom (24-100mm in 35mm format), a maximum aperture of f/1.8-f/2.8, ISO 12800, Full HD video shooting, 31 AF points, and Wi-Fi/NFC support. It inherits many characteristics of the previous G-series cameras, including the comparable G1X Mark II. The G7 X is the first G-series camera without a hot shoe.

G7 X Mark II
In 2016 Canon announced the Canon PowerShot G7 X Mark II which follows the original G7 X. It retains the same sensor and lens as its predecessor. The main improvement is the new DIGIC 7 Processor. In fact the G7 X Mark II is the first Canon camera to use this new chip. This new chip leads to better AF performance, object tracking, reduced ISO noise and higher speed burst shooting. Some other improvements are that the screen can now flip both up and down, a new grip, tiltable flash, auto functionality for the ND filter, battery charging over USB, and a new timelapse mode. The G7 X Mark II costs $650 on the official Canon website.

Model details

Note that the weight up to G12 is for the camera without the battery and from G1 X on the camera including the battery and the memory card.

Accessories

The Powershot G series can employ several photographic accessories:
 Filters and other threaded lens accessories can be used with an adapter tube available from Canon or third party suppliers.
 Close-up lenses
 Wide angle or telephoto converter lenses
Starting from the G7, there is a bayonet mount on the front of the camera around the lens to directly attach lenses and accessories.

Powershot G series cameras have a standard threaded socket for mounting to a monopod or tripod. This can also be used for attaching the camera to various brackets or adapters.

With the hot-shoe for external flash, the Powershot G series can accept not only compatible flash units but also various connecting cords and wireless triggers.  However, the Powershot G series is sensitive to the voltage produced by certain flash units, particularly older designs. Canon recommends that the maximum trigger voltage be less than 6 volts for any flash or accessory attached to the hot-shoe.

Flash compatibility is somewhat of an issue with the Powershot G series. Canon EX flashes are compatible but all EX features may not necessarily be usable. In particular, when the Powershot G is in manual exposure mode, the external flash is also in manual mode; that is, ETTL flash control is not operable.

Use by a journalist
John D McHugh used a G12 when covering the Bahraini uprising.

See also

 Canon PowerShot A
 Canon PowerShot S/SX
 Canon PowerShot SD or Digital Elph

References

External links

New models 
 Canon PowerShot G7 – Canon USA website
 Canon PowerShot G9 – Canon USA website
 Canon PowerShot G10 – Canon USA website
 Canon PowerShot G11 – Canon USA website
 Canon PowerShot G12 - Canon USA website
 Canon G11 vs G12
 dpReview of G1 X

Old models 
 Canon G1 Info
 Canon G3 Info
 Canon G5 info
 Canon G6 info

G